A cell is a small room used by a hermit, monk, nun or anchorite to live and as a devotional space. Cells are often part of larger cenobitic monastic communities such as Catholic, Lutheran, Anglican and Orthodox Christian monasteries, as well as Buddhist vihara, but may also form stand-alone structures in remote locations. The word cell comes from the Old French celle meaning a monastic cell, itself from the Latin meaning "room", "store room" or "chamber".

Usually, a cell is small and contains a minimum of furnishings. It may be an individual living space in a building or a hermit's primitive solitary living space, possibly a cave or hut in a remote location. A small dependent or daughter house of a major monastery, sometimes housing just one or two monks or nuns, may also be termed a cell.

The first cells were in the Nitrian Desert in Egypt following the ministry of Paul of Thebes, Serapion, and Anthony the Great.<ref>Chryssavgis, John; Ware, Kallistos; Ward, Benedicta, In the Heart of the Desert: Revised Edition  The Spirituality of the Desert Fathers and Mothers (World Wisdom Bloomington, Ind., 2008) p15.</ref> in the mid 3rd century.

In some orders, such as the Trappists, the monks or nuns do not have cells but sleep in a large room called a dormitory. In eremitic orders like the Carthusians, the room called cell'' usually has the size and look of a small house with a separate garden.

Buddhism

In Buddhism, a vihara was a living arrangement similar to a Christian monastery.

See also
 Kathisma
 Skete
 Poustinia in Orthodox Christianity
 Therapeutae in Judaism
 Lavra

References

External links

Asceticism
Religious places
Rooms